Wegener Range is a mountain range with peaks rising to 1,800 m, trending WNW-ESE for about 45 nautical miles (80 km) between Maury Glacier and Fenton Glacier in southeast Palmer Land. The range was first photographed from the air by the United States Antarctic Service (USAS), 1940; rephotographed by the U.S. Navy, 1966–69, and mapped from these photographs by the United States Geological Survey (USGS). In association with the names of continental drift scientists grouped in this area, named by Advisory Committee on Antarctic Names (US-ACAN) after Professor Alfred L. Wegener.

Mountain ranges of Palmer Land